The Carlos Palanca Memorial Awards for Literature winners in the year 2006 (rank, title of winning entry, name of author).


English division
Short story
 First prize: Mahogany Water by Socorro Villanueva
 Second prize: Sink or Swim by Myrza Sison
 Third prize: Trips by Ma. Celeste Flores-Coscolluela

Futuristic fiction
 First prize: No winner
 Second prize: Suman by Corinna Esperanza A. Nuqui
 Third prize: A Monumental Race by Arturo Ilano

Short story for children
 First prize: Cut by Ma. Celeste Flores-Coscolluela
 Second prize: Big Brother by Grace Dacanay Chong
 Third prize: How Rosang Taba Won a Race by Dean Francis Alfar

Poetry
 First prize: The Highest Hiding Place by Lawrence L. Ypil
 Second prize: Building a House, and other Poems by Sid G. Hildawa
 Third prize: Illuminations and Sonorities by Raymundo T. Pandan Jr.

Essay
 First prize: Fungibility, Dead Souls and OCWs by Jose Edmundo O. Reyes
 Second prize: Hometown Stories and Footnotes to Childhood’s End by Edgardo B. Maranan
 Third prize: He’d Rather be Relevant by Martin V. Villanueva

One-act play
 First prize: Ming Ming by Steven Prince C. Fernandez
 Second prize: Gabrielle by Joachim Emilio B. Antonio
 Third prize: Life After Beth by Nikki Alfar

Full-length play
 First prize: The Death of Memory by Glenn S. Mas
 Second prize: Chinchina and the Five Mountains by Amelia L. Bonifacio
 Third prize: Ask Me Again When I’m Thirty by Maria Clarissa Estuar

Filipino division
Short story
 First prize: Si Intoy Syokoy ng Kalye Marino by Eros S. Atalia
 Second prize: Langaw by Kristian Sendon Cordero
 Third prize: Buwan at Lupa by Edgardo B. Maranan

Futuristic fiction
 First prize: Tala-Huli/Huling Tala: Si Manong, Sa Dyip, Ang Drayber at Ako, Ako Lang Naman, Ang Kanyang Pasahero by Michael Francis C. Andrada
 Second prize: De-Lata by Enrique C. Villasis
 Third prize: Lunes, Alas Diyes ng Umaga by Vladimeir B. Gonzales

Short story for children
 First prize: Ang Ikaklit sa Aming Hardin by Bernadette V. Neri
 Second prize: Taguan-Pung by Maynard G. Manasala
 Third prize: Ang Regalo ng Taong Ibon by Allan Alberto N. Derain

Poetry
 First prize: Sa Tanda ng Pagsisimula ng Buhay by Rebecca T. Añonuevo
 Second prize: Salit-salitang mga Tula ng Pagsulyap, Pakikibaka at Paglingap by Maria Josephine C. Barrios
 Third prize: Salamangka ng Santelmo by Emmanuel V. Dumlao

Essay
 First prize: Batang Tundo by Rosario Torres-Yu
 Second prize: Talambalay by Elyrah L. Salanga
 Third prize: Alingawngaw ng mga Kuliglig, Kalansing ng mga Tansan by Ramon M. Bernardo

One-act play
 First prize: The Palanca in My Mind by Job A. Pagsibigan
 Second prize: Aba Ginoong Mag-asawa by Joel V. Almazan
 Third prize: Dyip by Christian U. Tordecillas

Full-length play
 First prize: Gabriela by Ma. Josephine C. Barrios
 Second prize: Teatro Porvenir by Timothy Dacanay
 Third prize: ’Nay Isa by Liza Magtoto

Teleplay
 First prize: Milagroso by Rodolfo R. Lana Jr
 Second prize: Pulo by Jose Dennis C. Teodosio
 Third prize: Negatibo by Bonifacio P. Ilagan

Screenplay
 First prize: Kusina by Cenon O. Palomares
 Second prize: Tribu by Jim Libiran
 Third prize: Ang Mundo ay Iisa at Marami by Carlos A. Arejola

Iloko Short story
 First prize: Nabungon Iti Lawag by Bernardo D. Tabbada
 Second prize: Tugot by Danilo B. Antalan
 Third prize: Ni Ina Baket Gimma, Ti Aso, ken Ti Atang by Arnold P. Jose

Cebuano Short story
 First prize: Ang Ungo sa San Pilar by Lamberto Ceballos
 Second prize: Dayaspora by Richel G. Dorotan
 Third prize: Mata sa Bagyo by Eleazar T. Acampado

Hiligaynon Short story
 First prize: Duta para sa mga Iskolar sang Banwa by Leoncio P. Deriada
 Second prize: Ang Kapid by Peter Solis Nery
 Third prize: Sagal-i by Bryan Mari Argos

Kabataan essay
Essay
 First prize: Restructuring Idealism by Katrina G. Gomez
 Second prize: Home by Ryan Edward L. Chua
 Third prize: Coming Home by Hannah L. Co

Sanaysay (Filipino)
 First prize: No winner
 Second prize: Ang Pangako kay Asterz by Allan Jay. T. Allonar Jr.
 Third prize: No winner

References
 

Palanca Awards
Pal
Palanca